20 Inolvidables is a 2003 Latin compilation album series including:

20 Inolvidables (Los Bukis and Los Temerarios album)
20 Inolvidables, by José José
20 Inolvidables, by José Alfredo Jiménez
20 Inolvidables, by Los Yonic's
20 Inolvidables, by Los Acosta